Free form may refer to:

 A free morpheme as opposed to a bound morpheme or bound form in linguistic morphology
Free-form composition
Free form jazz
Free form fabrication in 3D printing 
Free-form language
Free form poetry
Free-form radio, programming format in which the disc jockey is given total control over what music to play
Free-form (video game gameplay)

Music
Free Form (Donald Byrd album) 
Free Form (Joe Harriott album)
"Free Form Guitar", track from Chicago Transit Authority (album)

See also
 Freeform (disambiguation)